Bhumi Uchhed Pratirodh Committee ('Committee against Land Evictions') was an organisation in West Bengal, India, formed to oppose the set-up of a Special Economic Zone (SEZ) in the rural area of Nandigram. It formed an important role in resisting land-acquisitions in the following Nandigram violence. BUPC was set up on January 5, 2007, through the merger of three existing anti-SEZ initiatives; Krishak Uchchhed Birodhi O Jonoswartho Roksha Committee (Committee Against Eviction of Peasants and to Save People's Interest', was formed in August 2006 by Socialist Unity Centre of India (SUCI) and Indian National Congress),supported by Bharatiya Janata Party, Krisi Jami Raksha Committee ('Committee to Save Farmland', founded by Trinamool Congress) and Gana Unnoyon O Jana Odhikar Sangram Samity ('Association for the Struggle of Mass
Development and People's Right', founded by Jamiat Ulema-e-Hind and PCC, CPI(ML)). Sisir Adhikary, a Trinamool Congress MLA, was the convenor of BUPC. The Joint Secretary of the organization was Nanda Patra, a Socialist Unity Centre of India (SUCI) leader.

References 

2007 establishments in West Bengal
Land rights movements
Politics of West Bengal
Organisations based in West Bengal
Organizations established in 2007